The 2022 FIFA U-20 Women's World Cup was the 10th edition of the FIFA U-20 Women's World Cup, the biennial international women's youth football championship contested by the under-20 national teams of the member associations of FIFA, since its inception in 2002 as the FIFA U-19 Women's World Championship (the age limit was raised from 19 to 20 in 2008). The tournament was held in Costa Rica, which would have hosted the 2020 edition before it was cancelled due to the COVID-19 pandemic. It was the second time that Costa Rica host a FIFA tournament after the 2014 FIFA U-17 Women's World Cup.

Japan were the defending champions. The opening match played at the tournament was contested between Costa Rica and Australia at Estadio Nacional de Costa Rica, San José. The final was held on 28 August 2022. For the first time in the history of the FIFA youth tournaments, for both men and women, there was a back-to-back final between the two same teams.

Host selection 
Costa Rica and Panama were originally selected as co-hosts of the 2020 FIFA U-20 Women's World Cup on 20 December 2019, before the withdrawal of Panama leaving Costa Rica as the only host country. On 17 November 2020, FIFA announced that the 2020 edition of the tournament would be cancelled due to the COVID-19 pandemic. Instead, Costa Rica was appointed a host of the next edition of the tournament scheduled for 2022.

Qualified teams 
A total of 16 teams qualify for the final tournament. In addition to Costa Rica who automatically qualifies as host, 15 teams qualify from six continental competitions.

Notes

Venues 
The two host cities were announced on 10 August 2021.

Draw 
The official draw took place on 5 May 2022, 13:00 local time (UTC-6), at the Teatro Nacional de Costa Rica in San José. The teams were allocated based on their performances in the 5 previous U-20 Women's World Cups, five bonus points are added to each of the confederation's current champions that won the respective qualifying tournament (for this cycle).
The hosts Costa Rica were automatically seeded and assigned to position A1. Teams of the same confederation could not meet in the group stage.

Squads 

Players born between 1 January 2002 and 31 December 2006 are eligible to compete in the tournament.

Match officials 
A total of 13 referees, 26 assistant referees and 14 video match officials (VAR and AVAR) were appointed officially by FIFA for the tournament on 1 June 2022.
The Video assistant referee (VAR) system will be utilize for the first time in a FIFA U-20 Women's World Cup.

Group stage 
The draw for the group stage took place on 5 May 2022.

Tiebreakers 
The top two teams of each group advanced to the quarter-finals. The format for tiebreakers were determined as follows:

If two or more teams were equal on the basis of the above three criteria, their rankings were determined as follows:

All times are local, CST (UTC–6).

Group A

Group B

Group C

Group D

Knockout stage 
In the knockout stages, if a match was level at the end of normal playing time, extra time would be played (two periods of 15 minutes each) and followed, if necessary, by a penalty shoot-out to determine the winner. However, for the third place match, no extra time will be played and the winner will be determined by a penalty shoot-out if necessary.

Bracket

Quarter-finals

Semi-finals

Third place match

Final 

The 2022 final is a rematch of the 2018 final, the previous final.

Awards
The following awards were given for the tournament:

Goalscorers

Final standings
Per statistical convention in football, matches decided in extra time are counted as wins and losses, while matches decided by penalty shoot-outs are counted as draws.

|-
| colspan="10"| Eliminated in the Quarter-finals
|-

|-
| colspan="10"| Eliminated in the Group Stage
|-

|}

Marketing

Branding 
The official emblem and slogan were unveiled on 10 August 2021, one year prior to the start of the tournament.

"Vamos juntas" by Isabella Castro, Rebeca Malavassi, Tony Succar and the female choir of the Franz Liszt Schule served as the official song of the tournament. (Produced and composed by Costa Rican artist Jorge Castro).

Notes

References

External links 
 

 
2022
2022 in women's association football
2022 in youth association football
2022 in Costa Rican sport
International association football competitions hosted by Costa Rica
August 2022 sports events in North America